King Mongkut's Institute of Technology Ladkrabang (KMITL or KMIT Ladkrabang for short) is a research and educational institution in Thailand. It is situated in Lat Krabang District, Bangkok approximately 30 km east of the city center.  The university consists of nine faculties: engineering, architecture, science, industrial education and technology, agricultural technology, information technology, food industry, liberal arts, and medicine.

History

KMITL was founded in 1960 in Nonthaburi province as a telecommunications training center under the technical support of the Japanese government; the center was later named the Nonthaburi Institute of Telecommunications. After moving to a new location at Lat Krabang near Suvarnabhumi Airport, the campus became King Mongkut's Institute of Technology Ladkrabang.

Engineering began at KMITL in 1960 with a course on telecommunications engineering.

Since a technical cooperation agreement (August 1960-August 1965) was reached between the Japanese and Thai governments in 1960 to establish a telecommunications training center in Thailand, Japan has continued the cooperation over the course of 40 years. The telecommunications training center became a three-year specialty college in 1964, and then in 1971 joined two other colleges and rose to the ranks of an institute of technology. Part of the school moved to the Ladkrabang campus, and architecture, industrial education/science, and agricultural technology departments were established.

On the Japanese side, Tokai University (1977), Tokyo Institute of Technology (1992) and University of Electro-Communications (1997) concluded academic exchange agreements with the school and assisted with such things as the expansion of the university, human resource development and research promotion as part of second phase (December 1978-August 1983) and third phase (April 1988-March 1993) “Project-type Technical Cooperation” projects. A Japanese corporation funded scholarship system was established (1971), as well as practical factory-based training (1977), a construction scholarship system (1989), etc. Thus, actual cooperation activities involving linkages with industry as well as things like the start of an invitation program to the Institute for Posts and Telecommunications Policy and a human resource exchange with a public institution were promoted.

In 1982 KMITL launched the nation's first doctoral degree in electrical engineering and awarded a doctorate in electrical engineering to Dr. Chom Kimpan, who also earned the first Doctor of Engineering granted by a Thai university.

Through the “Partners Project” (1992), using a satellite launched by Japan, there were joint experiments in applied technology (areas such as distance medicine, distance education, computer networking, satellite broadcast, and joint development of a human resource training system using distance education, as well as the implementation of a continuation project called the “Post-Partners Project” (1996).

Besides this, as using the developed skills and facilities for the benefit of other developing countries, JICA has been active in supporting KMITL in organizing “third-country training” in information technology (started in 1978; presently known as the Japan-Thai Partnership Program, JTTP; having completed 11 programs with 13 courses established), dispatched KMITL professors to the engineering department of National University of Laos and supported KMITL’s acceptance of research students from universities in Laos.

More recently KMITL has partnered with Thailand Advanced Institute of Science and Technology, a joint effort among Tokyo Institute of Technology, Thailand National Science and Technology Development Agency, KMITL and SIIT to offer international master's degree in Automotive Engineering. From its inception, KMITL has grown to include seven faculties and affiliated research centers.

At present, KMITL has been recognized as one of the science and technology universities in Thailand. This could be because of Japan’s long-term and ongoing assistance; comprehensive assistance to the university, industry and each level of government; the significant influence of early graduates of study abroad programs in Japan. In the future, one can expect continued development through KMITL’s participation in the Southeast Asia Engineering Education Network (SEED-NET) and strengthening of links with other higher education institutions.

In 2017, Carnegie Mellon University set up a joint institute with KMITL with the support of the Office of the Higher Education Commission. This was named CMKL University and first opened for student admissions in the 2018 academic year.

Faculties and departments
School of Graduate Studies
International College
KMITL Business School (KBS) 
International Programs
Doctor of Philosophy in Industrial Business Administration
Master of Business Administration
Bachelor of Business Administration
Bachelor of Business Administration, Global Entrepreneur
Business Administration
Innovative Industrial Management
Management and Innovative Entrepreneurship
Global Entrepreneur
Industrial Business Administration
Business Economics and Management
Faculty of Engineering
Department of Agricultural Engineering
Department of Biomedical Engineering
Department of Chemical Engineering
Department of Civil Engineering
Department of Computer Engineering
Department of Electrical Engineering
Department of Electronics Engineering
Department of Food Engineering
Department of Industrial Engineering
Department of Instrumentation Engineering
Department of Mechanical Engineering
Department of Telecommunication Engineering
Faculty of Architecture
Department of Architecture
Department of Interior Architecture
Department of Industrial Design
Industrial Design
3D-Based Communication Design
Department of Communication Arts and Design
Communication Design
Film and Video
Photography
Department of Fine Arts 
Painting
Sculpture
Printmaking
Department of Urban and Environmental Planning
Faculty of Science
Department of Biology
Department of Chemistry
Department of Computer Science
Department of Mathematics
Department of Physics
Department of Statistics
Faculty of Industrial Education
Department of Engineering Education
Department of Architecture Education
Department of Agricultural Education
Department of Industrial Education
Department of Language and Social 
Japanese
English
Faculty of Agricultural Technology
Department of Agronomy
Department of Horticulture
Department of Animal Production Technology
Department of Animal Science
Department of Agricultural Development
Agricultural Development
Agricultural Communication
Department of Soil Science
Department of Plant Pest Management 
Faculty of Agro-Industry
Department of Agricultural Industry
Department of Fermentation Technology
Department of Food process Engineering
Faculty of Information Technology
Faculty of International College
Department of Software Engineering
Department of Engineering and Technology Management
College of Advanced Manufacturing Innovation (AMI)
Faculty of Medicine

Centers and services

Research Center for Communication and Information Technology (ReCCIT)
The KMITL Research Center for Communication and Information Technology (ReCCIT) project is the fourth “project-type technical cooperation” project implemented at KMITL and has as its goals strengthening the center’s research and development capacity and the graduate school program.

The implementing partner organizations are the Ministry of University Affairs, KMITL, and a Japan-based advisory committee (Ministry of Internal Affairs and Communications or formerly Ministry of Public Management, Home Affairs, Posts and Telecommunications; Tokyo Institute of Technology; Tokai University) has been established. Through the dispatch of experts in information technology, technical training of overseas participants, provision of research and educational equipment, the goals of the project are being pursued:
 establishment of an information technology research center
 strengthening of graduate school programs in the field of information technology at the Center and other research labs that are the targets of the cooperation.

Through these research facilities, KMITL maintains creative partnerships with government and private industry.

Industry/University Cooperative Research Center in Data Storage Technology and Applications
The I/UCRC in Data Storage Technology and Applications or iDSTA is formed under partnership between KMITL and NECTEC under the Thailand's Hard Disk Drive Competitiveness Enhancement Program. The aim is to increase research and development activities in this area and to enhance cooperation among researchers and between the researchers and the HDD industry in Thailand.
Advanced Research Center for Photonics
Nanotechnology Research Center (in co-operation with NANOTECH of NSTDA) 
Business Incubator Center
Electronics Research Center
Computer Research and Service Center
Electrical and Electronic Products Testing Center (PTEC) established under the co-operation of NSTDA and KMITL
Engineering Service and Development Center 
Scientific Instruments Service Centre (SISC)
Engineering Research Park

Campuses
King Mongkut's Institute of Technology Ladkrabang 
King Mongkut's Institute of Technology Ladkrabang Prince of Chumphon Campus

Notable faculty and alumni
Pakorn Peetathawatchai - President, The Stock Exchange of Thailand
Sumeth Damrongchaitham - CEO and President, Thai Airways
Punya Thitimajshima, co-inventor of Turbo code, Shannon limit-approaching code and the recipient of the 1998 IEEE Information Theory Society Golden Jubilee Award and Former Professor of Telecommunication Engineering, KMITL
Pirada Techavijit, first Thai to space, selected by Axe Apollo Space Academy
Saravoot Yoovidhya, youngest son of tycoon Chaleo Yoovidhya and Managing Director of The Red Bull Beverage Co., Ltd.
Suchatvee Suwansawat, MIT Alumni; dean of KMITL Engineering and Professor, Chairman of the Board, National Housing Authority; president of Engineering Institute of Thailand, KMITL President 
Wanpracha Chaovalitwongse, Professor of Industrial Engineering, 21st Century Leadership Chair in Engineering, and Co-Director of the Institute of Advanced Data Analytics., The University of Arkansas, USA
Agachai Sumalee, APEC Science Prize winner, professor of Civil and Transportation Engineering at Hong Kong Polytechnic University, China
Thanwa Laohasiriwong, former IBM Country General Manager
Vatsun Thirapatarapong, managing director for Cisco (Thailand) 
Chaiwat Kovavisarach, CEO, Bangchak Petroleum Public Company
Pitipan Tepartimargorn, COO and senior executive vice president at PTT Public Co. Ltd
Bundit Sapienchai, senior executive vice president at Bangchak Petroleum Public Co., Ltd
Itti Palangkool, pop rock singer during the 1990s
Kongdej Jaturanrasamee, Thai screenwriter and film director
Wibool Piyawattanametha, "Top 40 Under 40 Young Scientist" selected by the World Economic Forum
Sermsak Jaruwatanadilok, NASA scientist at Jet Propulsion Laboratory 
Dusit Niyato, Professor of Computer Science, School of Computer Science and Engineering (SCSE) and School of Physical and Mathematical Sciences (SPMS) at the Nanyang Technological University and a Fellow of IEEE.
Yaowalak Traisurat, Miss Thailand Universe 2003
Kokaew Pikulthong, former member of Parliament and leader of National United Front of Democracy Against Dictatorship
Songkarn Chitsuthipakorn, former member of Parliament
Kongdej Jaturanrasamee, screenwriter and film director 
Somsak Thepsutin, former vice leader of the Thai Rak Thai Party and former deputy prime minister, former Minister of Labour and Social Welfare, and former Minister of Industry
Srimuang Charoensiri, former Minister of Education and senator
Putthi Tulayathun, vice president, Mercedes-Benz (Thailand)
Chaiyot Piyawannara, president and country manager, ABB (Thailand)
Pimuk Simaroj, president of SUSCO Dealers Ltd, former Member of Parliament and Deputy Spokesperson of Thai Rak Thai Party 
Anusorn Kraiwatnussorn, former Member of Parliament and Vice Minister of Labour
Somsak Phurisrisak, Minister of Tourism and Sports, Former Governor of Suphan Buri
Songsak Premsuk, managing director of Voice TV
Samai Anuwatkasem, Chairman of the Board of Metropolitan Waterworks Authority
Nath Vongpanich - CEO of Central Familymart Company Limited
Yongkiat Kitaphanich - CEO and Executive Director, Somboon Advance Technology PCL
Kitisak Sriprasert - CEO and President of CAT Telecom
Jirayuth Rungsritong - Former CEO and President of CAT Telecom
Arnon Tubtiang - Former CEO of TOT Public Company
Nopporn Witoonchart - CEO and Co-founder of Siam Future Development 
Pongchai Amatanon - CEO and Founder of Forth Corporation 
Polsak Lertputipinyo - CEO and Co-Founder, Stars Microelectronics (Thailand) PCL
Pairash Thajchayapong - 2005 PICMET Leadership in Technology Management Award Recipient, Outstanding Scientist of 1991, former C11 Professor of Computer Engineering, former Permanent Secretary of the Ministry of Science and Technology, President of the National Science & Technology Development Agency (NSTDA), and former KMITL Rector 
Sitthichai Pookaiyaudom - IEEE Fellow, Minister of Information and Communication Technology, Former President of Mahanakorn University of Technology, former Professor of Electronics Engineering and former Dean of the School of Engineering and of Graduate Studies
Sujate Jantarang - President of Mahanakorn University of Technology 
Chalermek Intanagonwiwat - Computer Scientist known for his work on directed diffusion
Wanchat Padungrat - Founder of Pantip.com
Chusak Limsakul - President of Prince of Songkla University
Jareerat Petsom - Environmental advocate, host, director, scriptwriter and beauty pageant titleholder won Miss Earth Thailand 2021 and Miss Earth - Fire 2021

Sister universities
 Taiwan
National Formosa University

References

External links
King Mongkut's Institute of Technology Ladkrabang Official Website

Universities and colleges in Bangkok
Technical universities and colleges in Thailand
Educational institutions established in 1960
1960 establishments in Thailand
Engineering universities and colleges in Thailand